Old Varndeanians may refer to:
AFC Varndeanians F.C., a football club formerly known as Old Vardneanians
Former pupils of Varndean School